Robb Willer (born 1977) is an American sociologist and social psychologist who studies politics, morality, status, cooperation, and masculinity. He is a professor of sociology, psychology, and organizational behavior at Stanford University. He earned his Ph.D. in sociology at Cornell University.

Research
Robb Willer has published more than 40 scientific articles in journals such as Administrative Science Quarterly, American Journal of Sociology, American Sociological Review, Annual Review of Sociology, Journal of Personality and Social Psychology, Proceedings of the National Academy of Sciences, Proceedings of the Royal Society of London: Biological Sciences, and Psychological Science. He has received grants from the California Environmental Protection Agency, and the Ewing Marion Kauffman Foundation, and the National Science Foundation. As of July 12, 2017, his Google Scholar h-index was 30 and his i10-index was 49, with 5,402 citations.

Much of Willer's research focuses on political psychology and sociology, exploring both sources of political polarization and ways it can be reduced. He and Matthew Feinberg developed the idea of "moral reframing". Based on moral foundations theory, moral reframing is a technique of political persuasion in which a political message draws a connection between a given issue and the audience's assumed moral values. Willer's talk on political communication has been viewed over 1 million times since it was posted on the TED website January 20, 2017.

Willer's other research on politics emphasizes the effects of various forms of threat and anxiety on political attitudes, for example, the effects of racial status threats, terror threats, and masculinity threats. He has studied masculine overcompensation, showing that men whose masculinity has been threatened tend to adopt more stereotypically masculine attitudes on issues like war and gay rights.

His master's thesis used the text from the Sokal affair to investigate the effects of academic status on the evaluation of unintelligible academic texts, finding that unintelligible texts are evaluated more positively if authored by high status academics.

He contributed research to the best-selling book Modern Romance: An Investigation, by Aziz Ansari and Eric Klinenberg.

Teaching
Prior to moving Stanford, Willer was an assistant professor at UC Berkeley's Sociology Department. Willer was the 2009 recipient of the Golden Apple Award for Outstanding Teaching, the only teaching award given by the UC-Berkeley student body.

Selected publications
 Robb Willer, Ko Kuwabara, and Michael W. Macy. 2009. "The False Enforcement of Unpopular Norms". American Journal of Sociology. 115:451-90.
 Robb Willer. 2009. "Groups Reward Individual Sacrifice: The Status Solution to the Collective Action Problem". American Sociological Review. 74:23–43.
 Robb Willer, Christabel Rogalin, Bridget Conlon, and Michael T. Wojnowicz. 2013. "Overdoing Gender: A Test of the Masculine Overcompensation Thesis." American Journal of Sociology. 118:980-1022.

References 

American social psychologists
Cornell University alumni
1977 births
Living people
University of California, Berkeley faculty
Stanford University faculty
American moral psychologists